The 1959 Omloop Het Volk was the 15th edition of the Omloop Het Volk cycle race and was held on 5 April 1959. The race started and finished in Ghent. The race was won by Seamus Elliott.

General classification

References

1959
Omloop Het Nieuwsblad
Omloop Het Nieuwsblad
April 1959 sports events in Europe